The 2003–04 season was Blackpool F.C.'s 96th season (93rd consecutive) in the Football League. It was also their third consecutive season in the third tier of English football. They finished in fourteenth place.

Scott Taylor was the club's top scorer, with 27 goals (sixteen in the league, six in the FA Cup, three in the League Cup and two in the League Trophy).

Shortly after the season's conclusion, Steve McMahon resigned as the club's manager.

Table

References

2003-04
Blackpool